Christopher James Chaplin (born 8 July 1962) is a Swiss-born English composer and actor. He is the youngest son of film comedian Charlie Chaplin and his fourth wife Oona O'Neill. He is the grandson of Eugene O'Neill.

Biography

Christopher Chaplin was born on 8 July 1962 at Clinique de Mont Choisi in Lausanne, Switzerland. He is the youngest child of film actor Charlie Chaplin and his fourth wife Oona O'Neill: when Chaplin was born, his father was 73 years old. Chaplin's father died of a stroke in 1977 at the age of 88, when he was aged 15.

Chaplin studied piano under Irene Denereaz in Vevey, then settled in London to become an actor. He made his feature film debut as Ivan in the comedy film Where Is Parsifal? (1983), screened in the Un Certain Regard section at the 1984 Cannes Film Festival, and played Jacques Sette in Charles Jarrott's TV miniseries Till We Meet Again based on the eponymous novel by Judith Krantz.

In Peter Patzak's Gavre Princip - Himmel unter Steinen (Death of a Schoolboy), a historical documentary about the life of 17-year-old Gavrilo Princip, Chaplin took on the role of Trifco, and he played Franz Kafka in Jaromil Jireš's film Labyrinth (1991). The film received the Critic's Choice at the 1992 American Film Institute International Film Festival.

Chaplin played Rodrigo de Escobedo, the Spanish royal notary, secretary of Columbus fleet, and commander of La Navidad, in John Glen's historical film Christopher Columbus: The Discovery, released for the 500th anniversary of Columbus' voyage.
In Liliane de Kermadec's return to feature film, the French period road movie La Piste du télégraphe (1994), Chaplin played John alongside Elena Safonova's Lisa Alling. He played French poet Charles Cros in Agnieszka Holland's historical account of the relationship between Paul Verlaine and Arthur Rimbaud, Total Eclipse (1995).

Since 2005, Chaplin has focused on a career as a composer, and has collaborated with German experimental, ambient and electronic musician Hans-Joachim Roedelius, amongst others. In 2010, he signed to Fabrique Records, and released his solo debut album Je suis le Ténébreux in 2016.

Discography 
Seven Echoes – Kava & Christopher Chaplin (2010, Fabrique Records)
King of Hearts – Hans-Joachim Roedelius & Christopher Chaplin (2012, Sub Rosa)
Je suis le Ténébreux – Christopher Chaplin (2016, Fabrique Records) – featuring Hans-Joachim Roedelius, Christine Roedelius, Judith Chemla, Claudia Schumann, Pino Costalunga
Deconstructed (Remix EP) – Christopher Chaplin (2017, Fabrique Records) – featuring reworks by Tim Story, Jana Irmert, Peter Zirbs, <tfo>
Triptych in Blue – Hans-Joachim Roedelius, Christopher Chaplin & Andrew Heath (2017, Disco Gecko Recordings)
Paradise Lost – Christopher Chaplin (2018, Fabrique Records) – featuring Leslie Winer, Nathan Vale
BJARMI – Christopher Chaplin & Stereo Hypnosis (2019, Fabrique Records)
M – Christopher Chaplin (2020, Fabrique Records) – featuring Finley Quaye, Aurelia Thierree, Mira Lu Kovacs
Enosh – Christopher Chaplin (2020, Fabrique Records)
Jared – Christopher Chaplin (2021, Fabrique Records)

Remixes 
"Slippery Forces" – Boz Boorer (2012, Fabrique Records)
"Virtue" – Loretta Who (2016, Fabrique Records)

Filmography

References

External links 
 
 Official Facebook page

1962 births
Living people
English male film actors
Christopher
21st-century English male actors
People from Riviera-Pays-d'Enhaut District
20th-century English male actors
British people of American descent
British people of English descent
British people of Irish descent
Swiss people of British descent
Swiss people of English descent
Swiss people of Irish descent
Swiss people of American descent
Swiss emigrants to the United Kingdom
English people of Irish descent
English people of American descent